George Watson (20 February 1768 – 17 June 1824) was a British Member of Parliament.
 
He was the son of Lewis Watson, 1st Baron Sondes of Lees Court, Kent and his wife Grace, the daughter and coheiress of Hon. Henry Pelham of Esher Place, Surrey (later the Prime Minister) and educated at  Eton College (1780–85).

He was MP for Canterbury from 1800 to 1806 and appointed High Sheriff of Rutland for 1811–12.

He died unmarried aged 56. He was buried at Rockingham, Northamptonshire.

References

 

1768 births
1824 deaths
People educated at Eton College
Members of the Parliament of Great Britain for English constituencies
British MPs 1796–1800
Members of the Parliament of the United Kingdom for English constituencies
UK MPs 1801–1802
UK MPs 1802–1806
High Sheriffs of Rutland
Younger sons of barons